Vinegar Joe were an English Blues rock band, formed in 1971 in London. They released three albums on Island Records, but were best known for their live shows and launching the solo careers of Elkie Brooks and Robert Palmer.

History
Vinegar Joe evolved out of Dada, a 12-piece Stax-influenced, jazz/blues rock fusion band.  Dada released one eponymous album in 1970, with a line up including vocalist Elkie Brooks and guitarist Pete Gage. Singer Robert Palmer, formerly with The Alan Bown Set joined Dada after the album had been recorded. Dada were signed by Ahmet Ertegun for Atlantic Records. After their US tour, Ahmet sub-licensed them to Chris Blackwell of Island Records for the UK and rest of the world, with instructions to reduce the line up to form Vinegar Joe in 1971, adding keyboard player Dave Thompson, but the band was still without a drummer. Phil Collins had unsuccessfully applied for the job. Conrad Isidore and Rob Tait drummed on the first album. Tim Hinkley added keyboards alongside Dave Thompson and it was Hinkley who appeared on the cover of the first album. Their debut LP Vinegar Joe was released in April 1972 on Island Records in the UK and Atco Records in the US. The album cover featured plasticine models of the band created by John Padley.

Tim Hinkley took over from Thompson on keyboards and was succeeded by John Hawken. Drummer Rob Tait played the first series of live shows succeeded by John Woods. Mike Deacon took over on keyboards. During recording of their second album, Rock'n Roll Gypsies, also released in 1972, Keef Hartley played drums. Guitarist Jim Mullen also joined the band for this record and played on the US tour. The artwork for the album was supplied by Hipgnosis. Drummer Pete Gavin joined the band prior to the US tour and recording of their third and final album Six Star General released in 1973. The band dissolved in the spring of 1974. Alan Powell played drums during the band's final weeks.

Subsequently, Brooks and Palmer went on to enjoy success as solo musicians. Gage became a record producer and arranger, working with Brooks, his wife, until their divorce, and a range of musicians such as Joan Armatrading and specialising in upcoming rockabilly and punk bands including as Restless and King Kurt.

Album discography

Albums
 Dada – Dada, Atco Records, 1970 (pre-Vinegar Joe)
 Vinegar Joe – Island Records (UK), Atco Records (US) 1972 (re-issued on Lemon)
 Rock'n Roll Gypsies – Island Records (UK), Atco Records (US) 1972
 Six Star General – Island Records (UK), Atco Records (US) 1973

Compilation albums
Six Star Gypsies, 1994
Speed Queen of Ventura: An Introduction to Vinegar Joe, 2003
Vinegar Joe: The Island Recordings 1972-1973, 3CD, 2021 Cherry Red Records.

Charts

Former members
Elkie Brooks - vocals (1971–1974)
Pete Gage - guitars (1971–1974)
Robert Palmer - vocals (1971–1974)
Steve York - bass (1971–1974)
Dave Thompson - keyboards (1971–1972)
Conrad Isidore - drums (1971–1972)
Rob Tait - drums (1971–1972)
John Hawken - keyboards (1972)
John Woods - drums (1972)
Mike Deacon - keyboards (1972–1974)
Keef Hartley - drums (1972–1973)
Jim Mullen - guitars (1972–1974)
Pete Gavin - drums (1973–1974)
Alan Powell - drums (1974)

Additional musicians
Dave Brooks – tenor saxophone
Tim Hinkley – keyboards
Nick South – bass
Gasper Lawal – percussion

References

External links
 Steve York's official site

English rock music groups
English blues musical groups
British rhythm and blues musical groups
Island Records artists
Musical groups established in 1971
Musical groups disestablished in 1974